Djibril Thialaw Diop (born 6 January 1999) is a Senegalese professional footballer who plays as a defender for Eliteserien club Viking.

Career
Born in Thiès, Senegal, Diop started his career with Génération Foot in 2013. He made his senior debut for the club in 2017. In August 2021, he signed a two-year contract with Moroccan Botola club Hassania Agadir. On 31 August 2022, the last day of the summer transfer window, he signed a four-and-a-half-year contract with Norwegian Eliteserien club Viking. On 2 October 2022, he made his debut for the club in a 2–1 loss against Aalesund.

International career
On 28 July 2019, he made his international debut for Senegal in a 2020 African Nations Championship qualification match against Liberia.

Career statistics

References

1999 births
Living people
Sportspeople from Thiès
Association football defenders
Senegalese footballers
Senegal international footballers
Génération Foot players
Hassania Agadir players
Viking FK players
Senegal Premier League players
Botola players
Eliteserien players
Senegalese expatriate footballers
Expatriate footballers in Morocco
Senegalese expatriate sportspeople in Morocco
Expatriate footballers in Norway
Senegalese expatriate sportspeople in Norway